Meerganj is a village in Jaunpur district in the Indian state of Uttar Pradesh. Meerganj is located 6 km kilometres north-east of Janghai Junction railway station and 1 km west of Jarauna railway station.

Population
 The population in Meerganj was 1,074 as of the 2011 census.
 Number of houses, 136		
 Population, 1,074 of which 541 were male and 533 are female
 Children (0-6), 155 of which were 83 male and 72 were female
 Schedule Caste, 197 of which 107 were male and 90 were female
 Schedule Tribe, 0
 Literacy, 78% for all; 88% for males and 69% for females
 Total workers, 318, of which 219 were male and 99 were female
 Main workers, 218
 Marginal workers, 100 of which 51 were male and 49 were female

Educational institutes

Schools
 Primary School Meerganj
 Aasharam Shishu Shikaha Niketan
 Sterling School Meerganj
 ARJHS Meerganj
Primary School Sarai dewa
Primary School Bhatahar
Primary School Medpur Bankat
Primary School Meerpur
National islamia meerganj

College
 Sarvodya Vidhyapeeth Inter College
 Sarvodya Vidhyapeeth Degree College
 Ramdev Degree College
Sampurnanad Sanskrit mahavidyalay Darapur

coaching center
•NCP coaching center
•Pragati coaching center
•Taj coaching center

Hospitals
 JR K Hospital

Transportation

Rail
Meerganj is connected to Indian Railways. It has three nearby railway stations: Jarauna railway station, Sarai Kansrai railway station and Janghai Junction.

Road
Meerganj is connected to Jaunpur, Sant Ravidas Nagar, Varanasi, Allahabad and other cities like Azamgarh, Mirzapur, Janghai, Sultanpur, Ghazipur etc.

Airport
Lal Bahadur Shastri Airport (formerly Varanasi Airport) (IATA: VNS, ICAO: VIBN) is a public airport located at Babatpur 18 km (11 mi) northwest of Varanasi, and about 70 km from Meerganj. It located at Jaunpur-Varanasi highway.

References

Villages in Jaunpur district